Arjenak or Arjanak or Arjenk, also rendered as Arjang, may refer to:
 Arjenak, Chaharmahal and Bakhtiari
 Arjanak, Isfahan